Heather Gay (née Deans; born June 29, 1974) is an American television personality, businesswoman and author. She is best known for appearing as a main cast member on the reality television series, The Real Housewives of Salt Lake City.

Early life
Gay was born in Carmel, California to parents John & Susan (Carver) Deans. She grew up in the Church of Jesus Christ of Latter-day Saints (LDS Church).

Career

Television
Gay first gained notability after the premiere episode of the Bravo reality television series, The Real Housewives of Salt Lake City, in which she has starred since. She has also been featured in the third season of The Real Housewives Ultimate Girls Trip, alongside co-star and cousin Whitney Rose.

In addition to her appearances on The Real Housewives franchise, Gay has also appeared on talk shows including The Wendy Williams Show, Sherri and Watch What Happens Live with Andy Cohen. In late 2022, she made a guest appearance on Below Deck Adventure.

Businesses
In 2017, Gay and co-owner Andrea Nord, founded and launched a medical spa services company, Beauty Lab + Laser, in Murray, Utah.

Authoring
In February 2023, Gay published her book, Bad Mormon: A Memoir, which instantly made The New York Times Best Seller list.

Personal life
In July of 2000, Gay married Frank William "Billy" Gay III at the Laie Hawaii Temple. Billy is the grandson of prominent business executive Frank William Gay and nephew of Robert C Gay, a general authority of the LDS Church and former CEO of Huntsman Gay Global Capital (HGGC). 

The couple separated after 11 years of marriage but their divorce was not finalized until 2014.

Filmography

Bibliography
 Bad Mormon: A Memoir (2023)

References

External links
Heather Gay - BravoTV

1974 births
Living people
21st-century American women
American Latter Day Saints
People from Salt Lake City
The Real Housewives cast members
Brigham Young University alumni